"Be a Boy" is a song by English singer-songwriter Robbie Williams, taken from his ninth studio album, Take the Crown. It was released as the album's third and final single on 11 March 2013. The song was written by Robbie Williams, Tim Metcalfe and Flynn Francis. The song charted in Belgium. It was inspired by the fact people told Robbie his career was over, which is reference in the lines "They said it was leaving me, the magic was leaving me" and "I can make this last forever"

Music video
A music video to accompany the release of "Be a Boy" was first released onto YouTube on 29 January 2013 at a total length of three minutes and fifty-two seconds.

Track listing

Chart performance

Release history

References

2012 songs
2013 singles
Robbie Williams songs
Island Records singles
Song recordings produced by Jacknife Lee
Songs written by Robbie Williams